The Vickers-Carden-Loyd light amphibious tank (designated the A4E11 and A4E12 by the War Office), was a series of British experimental pre-World War II light tanks (resembling tankettes), which, although not taken into British service, were sold to a number of other countries which produced modified versions which were then taken into service.

Users 
Foreign buyers included China (29 or 32 tanks), Thailand, the Dutch East Indies (two delivered in 1937) and the USSR, with the latter producing some 1200 of the T-37A tanks developed from the A4E11/12. One tank with a licence was sold to Japan. Poland was interested in Vickers-Carden-Loyd amphibious tanks in the 1930s, but negotiations failed and instead the PZInż works started the PZInż 130 project, an indigenous design inspired by the British concept.

Surviving vehicles

: The only surviving tank is in the Kubinka Tank Museum.

Notes

External links
Amphibious Light Tanks, A4 and L1

Tankettes of the interwar period
Light tanks of the interwar period
Vickers
Interwar tanks of the United Kingdom
Military vehicles introduced in the 1930s
Amphibious tanks